Neosybra ropicoides is a species of beetle in the family Cerambycidae. It was described by Breuning.

References

Neosybra